Heidi Koch (born 23 February 1962) is an Austrian swimmer. She competed in the women's 100 metre freestyle at the 1980 Summer Olympics.

References

External links
 

1962 births
Living people
Olympic swimmers of Austria
Swimmers at the 1980 Summer Olympics
Place of birth missing (living people)
Austrian female freestyle swimmers